Aedia perdicipennis is a moth of the family Noctuidae first described by Frederic Moore in 1882. It is found in the north-eastern Himalayas of India, Nepal, Thailand, Myanmar, Taiwan, Singapore, Borneo, Sumatra and Sulawesi.

References

External links
"Aedia perdicipennis". Encyclopedia of Life.

Catocalini
Moths described in 1882
Moths of Asia